Little Black River may refer to two rivers in the U.S. state of Michigan:

 Little Black River (Cheboygan County), flows into Lake Huron near Cheboygan
 Little Black River (Gogebic County), a tributary of Black River in Gogebic County

See also 
 List of Michigan rivers named Black River
 Little Black River (disambiguation)

Rivers of Michigan
Set index articles on rivers of Michigan